Huangfu Duan is a fictional character in Water Margin, one of the Four Great Classical Novels in Chinese literature. Nicknamed "Purple Bearded Count", he ranks 57th among the 108 Stars of Destiny and 21st among the 72 Earthly Fiends.

Background

Huangfu Duan has green eyes and a long yellow beard, which suggest he might be of non-Han or mixed ancestry. Because of his looks, he is nicknamed the "Purple Bearded Count". He hails from Youzhou (幽州; around present-day Beijing), which borders the Khitan empire, but works as a veterinarian in Dongchang Prefecture (東昌府; in present-day Liaocheng, Shandong). He is especially good in treating horses, reputedly able to diagnose and cure 400 types of equine disease. He is a friend of "Featherless Arrow" Zhang Qing, the garrison officer of Dongchang.

Joining Liangshan
 
Huangfu Duan is the last of the 108 Stars of Destiny to appear in Water Margin. He is recommended to Song Jiang by Zhang Qing, who is captured and won over by Liangshan, which has come to Dongchang to seize its grain stock. Zhang is grateful to Song, who keeps him from harm by the Lianghshan chieftains whom he has injured with his stone-flinging skill. Song is glad to recruit Huangfu as horses are critical in all the activities of Liangshan, particularly battles.

Campaigns and service to government 

Huangfu Duan is appointed as the veterinarian in charge of all the livestock of Liangshan, particularly horses, after the 108 Stars of Destiny came together in what is called the Grand Assembly. He participates in the campaigns against the Liao invaders and rebel forces in Song territory following amnesty from Emperor Huizong for Liangshan.

But just before the last expedition starts, which targets Fang La, the emperor summons Huangfu Duan to the imperial capital Dongjing and appoints him an imperial veterinarian. Huangfu serves in that position for the rest of his life.

References
 
 
 
 
 
 
 

72 Earthly Fiends
Fictional veterinarians
Fictional characters from Beijing